R.E.O. is the sixth studio album by REO Speedwagon, released in 1976. It peaked at number 159 on the Billboard 200 chart in 1976. It marked the return of Kevin Cronin to the band after a four-year absence. Five of the songs ("Keep Pushin", "Any Kind of Love", "(Only A) Summer Love", "(I Believe) Our Time Is Gonna Come", and "Flying Turkey Trot") were featured on the band's subsequent live album, Live: You Get What You Play For. Many fans refer to the album as C.O.W. (or simply COW) due to the background of the cover art.

This was the band's last studio album to feature bassist Gregg Philbin; he would be replaced by Bruce Hall the following year. This album is co-sung by Kevin Cronin and Gary Richrath. On previous albums (Ridin' the Storm Out, Lost in a Dream, This Time We Mean It) Richrath would only sing one song; however, on this album he shares lead vocal duties equally with Cronin. He would stop singing on albums and in most live performances by 1978. "Breakaway" is a duet sung by both Cronin and Richrath where Richrath sings the verses while Cronin sings the first chorus by himself and the remaining choruses are sung by both Cronin and Richrath.

Track listing

Personnel
REO Speedwagon
Kevin Cronin – lead vocals (tracks 1, 2, 4, 5, 8), rhythm guitar
Gary Richrath – lead guitar, lead vocals (tracks 2, 3, 5, 7)
Neal Doughty – keyboards
Gregg Philbin – bass
Alan Gratzer – drums

Charts
Album - Billboard (United States)

Release history

References

REO Speedwagon albums
1976 albums
Epic Records albums